Buddie Petit (born Joseph Crawford; ca. 1897 – July 4, 1931), also spelled Buddy Petit, was an American early jazz cornetist.

His early life is somewhat mysterious, with dates of his birth given in various sources ranging from 1887 to 1897. He was said to have been born in White Castle, Louisiana, United States. His given name was Joseph Crawford, but he was adopted by the trombonist Joseph Petit, whose name he took.

He took Freddie Keppard's place in the Eagle Band (a place earlier held by Buddy Bolden) when Keppard left town. He was briefly lured to Los Angeles by Jelly Roll Morton and Bill Johnson in 1917, but he objected to being told to dress and behave differently from what he was accustomed to and returned to New Orleans. He spent the rest of his career in the area around greater New Orleans, and the towns north of Lake Pontchartrain, not venturing further from home than Baton Rouge and the Mississippi Gulf Coast.

Okeh Records offered him a chance to record on their 1925 field trip to New Orleans, but Petit held out for more money and was never recorded. Danny Barker and Louis Armstrong said that it was a great loss to jazz history that there are no recordings of Petit.

He died in July 1931, after "over-indulging" in food and drink.

References

External links

Buddy Petit (1895-1931) on Red Hot Jazz Archive
Buddy Petit at AllMusic

1890s births
1931 deaths
Jazz musicians from New Orleans
American jazz cornetists
20th-century American musicians
People from White Castle, Louisiana
The Eagle Band members
20th-century African-American musicians